WTVM (channel 9) is a television station in Columbus, Georgia, United States, affiliated with ABC. It is owned by Gray Television, which provides certain services to dual NBC/CW+ affiliate WLTZ (channel 38, owned by SagamoreHill Broadcasting) and Fox affiliate WXTX (channel 54, owned by American Spirit Media) under separate shared services agreements (SSAs). WTVM and WXTX share studios (which also house master control and most internal operations for WLTZ) on Wynnton Road (GA 22) in the Dinglewood section of Columbus; WTVM's transmitter is located in Cusseta, Georgia.

History
The station signed on for the first time on October 6, 1953, as WDAK-TV airing an analog signal on UHF channel 28. It was a primary NBC station with a secondary ABC affiliation. WDAK was the first television station in the Columbus market (beating rival WRBL by just over a month) and is the fifth-oldest in the state of Georgia and second-oldest outside Atlanta. During the late-1950s, the station was also briefly affiliated with the NTA Film Network. It was originally owned by Allen Woodall Sr. (owner of WDAK-AM 540) and Martin Theaters (forerunner of Carmike Cinemas and AMC Theatres). Studios were located on 1st Avenue in downtown Columbus where Carmike's corporate headquarters were until December 2016.

Woodall sold his interest in the station to Martin Theaters in 1956 and the call letters were changed to the current WTVM. It moved to VHF channel 9 in 1960 in a three-way switch-and-move approved by the Federal Communications Commission (FCC) in which WRBL moved from channel 4 to channel 3 and WTVY-TV in Dothan, Alabama, moved from channel 9 to channel 4. Eventually, WTVM's old channel 28 allotment was occupied by Georgia Public Broadcasting's WJSP-TV.

On the same day WTVM moved to channel 9, it switched its primary affiliation to ABC, while relegating NBC to secondary status shared with WRBL. This was very unusual for a then two-station market, especially one of Columbus' size. Usually, ABC, as the smallest and weakest network, was relegated to secondary status on one or both of existing stations. ABC would not be on the same footing with CBS and NBC until the 1970s, especially with markets of Columbus' size. However, Martin Theaters wanted to get WTVM in line with WTVC, which has always been an ABC affiliate. Additionally, fellow NBC affiliates WSB-TV in Atlanta and WSFA-TV in Montgomery, Alabama, both transmitted fairly clear Grade B signals to the region. In contrast, much of Western Georgia and Eastern Alabama did not have access to ABC full-time. The nearest ABC affiliate that put even a Grade B into Columbus was WLWA-TV in Atlanta (now NBC affiliate WXIA-TV), which easily covered much of the northern portion of the market. Martin realized that an ABC affiliation would not bring significant out-of-market competition. Augusta businessman J. B. Fuqua bought Martin Theaters in 1969, including both WTVM and WTVC.

Early in 1970, Fuqua moved WTVM to its present studios on Wynnton Road. The station switched to ABC full-time in October of that year when WYEA (now WLTZ) signed on and took over the NBC affiliation. Fuqua sold-off his broadcast interests in 1980, with WTVM going to Western Broadcasting. SFN Publishing eventually became the owner in 1984. A group of SFN managers formed Pegasus Broadcasting and purchased WTVM in 1986. AFLAC (which had owned WYEA at one point during the 1970s) bought the station in 1989, making channel 9 AFLAC's flagship station. In 1997, AFLAC sold its entire broadcasting division, including WTVM, to an investment group that merged with Ellis Communications to form Raycom Media. On February 2, 2012, Chief Meteorologist Derek Kinkade hinted on the WTVM Weather Facebook page that major studio changes were on the way. On February 16, all WTVM newscasts and Fox 54 News at 10 moved to the newsroom, while a temporary weather office was constructed in the hallway between the editing bay and the newsroom. The new HD-ready set is to be completed in early March. On July 22, 2012, WTVM began airing newscasts in High Definition starting with Fox 54 News at 10.

WTVM-DT2 previously carried a 24-hour local weather channel. Programming consisted of current weather conditions with forecasts, a live feed of "Live Doppler 9", and severe weather alerts when conditions warrant. On Saturday mornings, the subchannel broadcast educational shows to fulfill an E/I requirement. Despite being called "Storm Team 9 Weather Now", it was not affiliated with The Local AccuWeather Channel. It was replaced with Bounce TV on September 26, 2011. The channel is available on all cable systems in the viewing area.

Sale to Gray Television
On June 25, 2018, Atlanta-based Gray Television announced it had reached an agreement with Raycom to merge their respective broadcasting assets (consisting of Raycom's 63 existing owned-and/or-operated television stations, including WTVM), and Gray's 93 television stations) under the former's corporate umbrella. The cash-and-stock merger transaction valued at $3.6 billion—in which Gray shareholders would acquire preferred stock currently held by Raycom—resulted in WTVM gaining new sister stations in nearby markets, including CBS affiliate WTVY and NBC affiliate WRGX-LD in Dothan, Alabama (while separating it from WDFX-TV). The sale was approved on December 20, and was completed on January 2, 2019.

Programming

Syndicated programming
Syndicated programming on WTVM includes Entertainment Tonight, Inside Edition, and Dr. Phil.

News operation

WTVM presently broadcasts 27½ hours of locally produced newscasts each week (with 4½ hours each weekday, three hours on Saturdays and two hours on Sundays).

In addition to the main studios, the station operates an East Alabama bureau near the campus of Auburn University. WTVM produces a nightly prime time show for sister station WXTX known as Fox 54 News at 10. At one point, there was also an hour long broadcast seen weekday mornings at 7 on that station. However, this production (called Fox 54 Morning News) was canceled.

Raycom News Network and Raycom Alabama Weather Network
Since half of the viewing area includes eastern Alabama, WTVM is part of the Raycom News Network, a system designed to rapidly share information among Raycom's widespread group of television stations and websites in Alabama. A regional network has developed among Montgomery's WSFA, Huntsville's WAFF 48 News, and Birmingham's WBRC in which stations share information, equipment such as satellite trucks or even reporters' stories. Between them, these four stations cover most of the state of Alabama, with the exception of the Mobile–Pensacola DMA. The four stations also comprise the Raycom Weather Network and the Raycom Alabama Weather Blog, where meteorologists from all four stations post forecasts and storm reports, as well as live feeds from all of the cameras that the four stations operate. The site also has live feeds of "Live Doppler 9" (WTVM), "Doppler 12 StormVision" (WSFA), "FOX 6 VIPIR" (WBRC) and "Live StormTrack Doppler 48" (WAFF).

Live Doppler 9 Weather Center and ALFA Insurance Skycam Network
WTVM operates the Chattahoochee Valley's only live regional weather radar called "Live Doppler 9" (formerly known as TrueView Doppler 9), located on top of WTVM's midtown studios. The station also has access to four different Level 2 NEXRAD radars branded as the "Doppler 9 Radar Network" (formerly known as TrueView Tracker) which includes the capability to use 3-D graphics to track storms during newscasts. WTVM operates seven skycams (all but one, the Columbus Government Center skycam, are sponsored by ALFA Insurance) throughout the viewing area, and is a component in Raycom's statewide skycam networks throughout Alabama and Mississippi (also ALFA-sponsored). There are two in Columbus (St. Francis Hospital and Columbus Park Crossing), and one each in Pine Mountain, Georgia; Auburn, Alabama; Opelika, Alabama and Eufaula, Alabama.

Subchannels
The station's digital signal is multiplexed:

References

External links

ABC network affiliates
Bounce TV affiliates
Circle (TV network) affiliates
Grit (TV network) affiliates
Quest (American TV network) affiliates
This TV affiliates
Gray Television
Television channels and stations established in 1953
TVM
1953 establishments in Georgia (U.S. state)